The men's 200 metre individual medley event at the 2008 Olympic Games took place on 11–13 August at the Beijing National Aquatics Center in Beijing, China.

U.S. swimmer Michael Phelps blasted a new world record to defend his title in the event, and more importantly, claim his sixth Olympic gold, twelfth career, and fourteenth overall medal. He established a sterling time of 1:54.23 to lower his prior standard from the Olympic trials by almost six-tenths of a second (0.60). Hungary's László Cseh added a third silver to his collection, finishing with a European record of 1:56.52. Phelps' teammate and archrival Ryan Lochte earned a bronze in a time of 1:56.53, just a hundredth of a second (0.01) behind Cseh. The podium placements also replicated the results of the 400 m individual medley, held on the first day of the Games.

Brazil's Thiago Pereira finished fourth with a time of 1:58.14, and was followed in the fifth spot by Japan's Ken Takakuwa, in an Asian record of 1:58.22. A full second later, Great Britain's James Goddard posted a time of 1:59.24 to earn a sixth spot, while Canada's Keith Beavers (1:59.43) and Goddard's teammate Liam Tancock (2:00.76) rounded out the finale.

Records
Prior to this competition, the existing world and Olympic records were as follows.

The following new world and Olympic records were set during this competition.

Results

Heats

Semifinals

Semifinal 1

Semifinal 2

Final

References

External links
Official Olympic Report

Men's individual medley 200 metre
Men's events at the 2008 Summer Olympics